Huacaybamba District is one of four districts of the province Huacaybamba in Peru. The district was created in 1857 during the presidency of Ramón Castilla.

Ethnic groups 
The people in the district are mainly indigenous citizens of Quechua descent. Quechua  is the language which the majority of the population (65.93%) learnt to speak in childhood, 33.42% of the residents started speaking using the Spanish language (2007 Peru Census).

References